Refik Restaurant was a tavern in Asmalı Mescit, Beyoğlu, Turkey founded by Refik Arlslan (1923–2011) in 1954.

Arslan ran the Refik for almost 70 years. The restaurant remained operational for some time after Refik Arslan died in 2011. Refik was known as "one of the last remaining 'real' tavern keepers". After his death it is noted that what used to be place of community changed into a generic for-profit restaurant, losing its magic. It eventually closed down in 2020.

Significance among poets
Refik had long been known as a place where many well know poets would frequent. These include Refik Durbaş, Bekir Sami Sertöz, Özdemir Asaf, Ferit Edgü and Tezer Özlü. The last two of whos correspondence regarding the tavern has been documented:

The poet Özdemir Asaf would, as documented by fellow poet Refik Durbaş, fill his table with whites. These include rakı mixed with water, ayran or yoghurt, feta cheese and cauliflower.

Als also people from other branches have been noted to have been there including Gürdal Duyar (sculptor).

References

Sources

1954 establishments in Turkey
Restaurants in Turkey
Pubs
Beyoğlu